"Once You've Tasted Love" is a dance song by boy band Take That. Written by Gary Barlow and produced by Duncan Bridgeman, "Once You've Tasted Love" was released on 27 January 1992 as the third single from the band's debut album, Take That & Party (1992). It was not a success, charting at number 47 on the UK Singles Chart.

Critical reception
Music Week wrote, "Irrespressibly bouncy with a sheen borrowed from PWL, it's actually a fairly decent song, but it tries a little too hard to steer a middle course between being a pop record and being a dance record, so could fail to realise its full potential. A tighter mix, geared in either direction, could do the trick." Simon Williams from NME said, "The synth-mungous likes of 'Once You've Tasted Love' and 'Promises' are amiably crass hi-NRG rompalongs, sort of Kajagoogoo gone Italian House."

Music video
The music video for the song was shot on a low budget in a warehouse. The band is shown performing the song against a white backdrop.

Track listings

Austrian CD single (PC45257)
 "Once You've Tasted Love" (Aural Mix) – 8:12
 "Guess Who Tasted Love" (Guess Who Mix) – 5:25
 "Once You've Tasted Love" (Radio Version) – 3:33

UK 7-inch vinyl (PB45257)
 "Once You've Tasted Love" – 3:43
 "Guess Who Tasted Love" – 5:25

UK 7-inch vinyl (PB45265) (Limited Edition w/ desktop pop-up 1992 calendar)
 "Once You've Tasted Love" – 3:43
 "Guess Who Tasted Love" – 5:25

UK 12-inch vinyl (PT45258)(Limited Edition picture disc)
 "Once You've Tasted Love" (Aural Mix) – 8:12
 "Guess Who Tasted Love" (Guess Who Mix) – 5:25
 "Once You've Tasted Love" (Radio Version) – 3:33

UK cassette (PK45257)
 "Once You've Tasted Love" – 3:43
 "Guess Who Tasted Love" – 5:25

Personnel
 Gary Barlow – lead vocals
 Howard Donald – backing vocals
 Jason Orange – backing vocals
 Mark Owen – backing vocals
 Robbie Williams – backing vocals

Charts

References

1992 singles
1992 songs
Songs written by Gary Barlow
Sony Music UK singles
Take That songs